This is a list of disasters in Australia by death toll.

100 or more deaths

50 to 99 deaths

20 to 49 deaths

Between 10 and 20

Gallery

Significant incidents resulting in fewer than 10 deaths

Significant incidents of Australians being killed overseas
Excludes deaths attributable to war.

See also
 Lists of shipwrecks
 Timeline of major crimes in Australia
 List of massacres of Indigenous Australians
List of natural disasters in Australia
 List of disasters in Antarctica by death toll
 List of disasters in Canada by death toll
 List of disasters in Croatia by death toll
 List of disasters in Great Britain and Ireland by death toll
 List of disasters in New Zealand by death toll
 List of disasters in Poland by death toll
 List of disasters in Sweden by death toll
 List of disasters in the United States by death toll

References

External links
Emergency Management Australia Disasters Database
Major bushfires in Victoria (PDF)
The William Booth Memorial Home Fire (Australia's Deadliest Building Fire)

Disasters by death toll
 
Australia
Disasters
A